The Orienteering World Cup is a series of orienteering competitions organized annually by the International Orienteering Federation. Two unofficial cups were organized in 1983 and 1984. The official World Cup was held first in 1986, and then every second year up to 2004. From 2004 the World Cup has been held annually.

Hosting nations

Points distribution 
The object of the World Cup is to collect points during the season. The 40 best runners in each event are awarded points, where the winner is awarded 100 points. The current points distribution are as follows:

World Cup overall results

Women

Men

Records

Most overall wins 
The table shows all winners of the overall World Cup who achieved minimum two top 3 finishes.
 Active athletes are bolded.

Men

Women

Most race victories 
This is a list of the orienteers who have won two or more World Cup races.
 Results from the World Cup's inception in 1986 until the 1996 are incomplete. 
 Active athletes are bolded.

Men

Women

See also 
 International Orienteering Federation (IOF)
 World Orienteering Championships
 Junior World Orienteering Championships
 European Orienteering Championships

References 

 
World Cup
Orienteering
Recurring sporting events established in 1983